The following are the national records in Olympic weightlifting in Tunisia. Records are maintained in each weight class for the snatch lift, clean and jerk lift, and the total for both lifts by the Fédération Tunisienne d'Haltérophilie.

Current records

Men

Women

Historical records

Men (1998–2018)

Women (1998–2018)

References

Tunisia
Tunisia
Weightlifting
Olympic weightlifting